WMBJ (88.3 FM, "HIS Radio") is a radio station licensed to serve Murrells Inlet, South Carolina.  The station is owned by Radio Training Network, Inc. It airs a Contemporary Christian music format. In addition to simulcast and syndicated programming, WMBJ airs programming from local churches.

The station was assigned the WMBJ call letters by the Federal Communications Commission on November 18, 1999.

Translators

References

External links
WMBJ official website

Contemporary Christian radio stations in the United States
Georgetown County, South Carolina
Radio stations established in 1999
1999 establishments in South Carolina
MBJ